Derbin Island is located in the Krenitzin Islands, a subgroup of the Fox Islands in the eastern Aleutian Islands, Alaska, United States. Derbin is a small island (at 0.5 mi across) and is situated near the southwestern shore of Tigalda Island. It was named in 1935 by the U.S. Coast and Geodetic Survey because of its proximity to Derbin Strait, the channel between Avatanak and Tigalda islands. Derbin Strait, in turn, is derived from "Derbenskoy," the Russian name published by Father Veniaminov (1840).

References

Krenitzin Islands
Islands of Alaska
Islands of Aleutians East Borough, Alaska